Manuela Modupe Udemba, professionally known as Shanga, is a Swiss–Nigerian singer-songwriter, audio engineer, and record producer. She was born in Bern, Switzerland and pursued her career after being certified as an audio engineer.

Early life
Shanga was raised between Nigeria and Switzerland, where she completed her elementary and high school. After her tertiary education, she enrolled in an audio engineering school in Hamburg.

Career
Shanga released her EP titled Embracing Vulnerability in 2013. In 2014, she received good critique for her unique body of work and was praised on Swiss Der Bund newspaper for her artistic work and musical style.

Between 2018 and 2019, she released Chuchichäschtli, Sweeter Than Wine and Show Me. In April 2020, she released her first single titled Certified from her debut album Bold. The song is a unique fusion of afro and grime, which was produced by beat chronicles (Bisi Udemba) and mixed & mastered by Grammy-nominated Ben Mühlethaler for his works with Prince.

In July 2020, her second single Kelele was released. The song peaked at No.1 on iTunes Swiss Charts (7 August 2020) and No. 4 on Billboard Swiss Digital Sales Charts in the week of 15 August 2020.

In October 2020, Shanga released her debut album Bold.

Discography

EPs
Embracing Vulnerability (2013)

Albums 
Bold (2020)

Singles

References

External links
 

1993 births
Living people
Swiss women musicians
21st-century women rappers
Musicians from Lagos
21st-century Nigerian women singers
21st-century women guitarists
21st-century Nigerian businesswomen
21st-century Nigerian businesspeople
Nigerian singer-songwriters
21st-century women composers
Nigerian expatriates in Switzerland
Nigerian record producers